James Galvin may refer to:
 Jim Galvin (baseball) (1907–1969), Major League Baseball player
 Pud Galvin (1856–1902), Major League baseball player
 James Galvin (poet) (born 1951), American poet

See also
James Gavin (disambiguation)